Anatoly Tankov (born 5 September 1941) is a Soviet equestrian. He competed in two events at the 1988 Summer Olympics.

References

1941 births
Living people
Soviet male equestrians
Olympic equestrians of the Soviet Union
Equestrians at the 1988 Summer Olympics
Place of birth missing (living people)